Miguel Darío Miranda y Gómez (December 19, 1895 – March 15, 1986) was a Mexican Cardinal of the Roman Catholic Church. He served as Archbishop of Mexico City from 1956 to 1977, and was elevated to the cardinalate in 1969.

Biography
Miguel Miranda y Gómez was born in León, Guanajuato, to Cipriano Miranda and his wife, María de las Nieves Gómez. After studying at the seminary in León and the Pontifical Gregorian University in Rome, he was ordained to the priesthood on October 28, 1918. Miranda then did pastoral work in León until 1925, and began teaching at its seminary in 1929. From 1925 to 1926, he was the Director of the National Social Secretariat. Under the religious persecutions enacted by Mexican President Plutarco Elías Calles, Miranda was imprisoned and later forced to leave the country from 1926 to 1929.

On October 1, 1937, Miranda was appointed Bishop of Tulancingo by Pope Pius XI. He received his episcopal consecration on the following December 8 from Archbishop Leopoldo Ruiz y Flóres, with Archbishop José Márquez Toriz and Bishop Maximino Ruiz y Flóres serving as co-consecrators, in the Shrine of Guadalupe. Miranda was advanced to Coadjutor Archbishop of Mexico City and Titular Archbishop of Selymbria on December 20, 1955. On the death of Luis Martínez y Rodríguez on 28 June 1956, he became his successor as Archbishop of Mexico City.

Miranda, who was a staunch advocate of social justice, attended the Second Vatican Council from 1962 to 1965 and served as President of the Latin American Episcopal Conference from 1958 to 1963. Pope Paul VI created the Mexican primate Cardinal Priest of Nostra Signora di Guadalupe a Monte Mario in the consistory of April 28, 1969. However, Miranda never had the opportunity of participating in a papal conclave, as he reached the age of 80 (the age limit for cardinal electors) on December 19, 1975. Before resigning as Mexico City's archbishop on July 19, 1977, he was the papal legate to the dedication of the Basilica of Our Lady of Guadalupe on October 12, 1976.

The Cardinal died in his native León at 90. He is buried in the Mexico City Metropolitan Cathedral.

Trivia
Miranda greeted Charles de Gaulle of France at the Guadalupe Basilica for a Mass during a visit to Mexico in 1942.
He received an honorary doctorate in laws from the University of Notre Dame.
Miranda also supported Opus Dei.

References

External links
Cardinals of the Holy Roman Church
Catholic-Hierarchy

 

1895 births
1986 deaths
People from León, Guanajuato
20th-century Roman Catholic archbishops in Mexico
Mexican cardinals
Roman Catholic archbishops of Tulancingo
Participants in the Second Vatican Council
Cardinals created by Pope Paul VI
Roman Catholic archbishops of Mexico (city)
Bishops appointed by Pope Pius XI